Anon Boonsukco (born April 1, 1978) is a Thai former professional footballer who played as a midfielder.

External links
 Profile at Goal
 

1978 births
Living people
Anon Boonsukco
Anon Boonsukco
Association football midfielders
Anon Boonsukco
Anon Boonsukco
Anon Boonsukco
Anon Boonsukco
Anon Boonsukco
Anon Boonsukco
Anon Boonsukco
Anon Boonsukco